Lee Jin-Il (born January 12, 1973 in Daegu) is a retired South Korean athlete who competed in the 800 metres. His personal best time is 1.44.14 in 800 metres, achieved in June 17, 1994 in the South Korean Athletics Championships. This is the current South Korean record. It was also the Asian record until it was broken by Yusuf Saad Kamel in 2004.

Lee took part in the 1992 IAAF World Cup and came in fifth place. He won the gold medal in the 800 m at the 1993 East Asian Games and went on to win consecutive gold medals at the Asian Games. He represented South Korea on the global stage three times: first at the 1992 Barcelona Olympics where he finished third in his 800 m heat, then he competed at the 1993 IAAF World Indoor Championships where he was sixth in the semi-finals, and finally he took part in the 1993 World Championships in Athletics later that year. In 1995 he was suspended for two years after a doping violation.

Achievements
1998 Asian Games - gold medal
1994 Asian Games - gold medal (Games record)
1993 Asian Championships - gold medal
1992 World Junior Championships - silver medal
1991 Asian Championships - gold medal

References

1973 births
Living people
South Korean male middle-distance runners
Athletes (track and field) at the 1992 Summer Olympics
Olympic athletes of South Korea
Athletes (track and field) at the 1994 Asian Games
Athletes (track and field) at the 1998 Asian Games
Sportspeople from Daegu
Asian Games medalists in athletics (track and field)
Asian Games gold medalists for South Korea
Medalists at the 1994 Asian Games
Medalists at the 1998 Asian Games